Øvre Eikeland or simply Eikeland is a village in Vennesla municipality in Agder county, Norway. The lake Eikelandsvatnet lies a short distance east of the village.

References

Villages in Agder
Vennesla